La dueña (English: The Owner) is a Mexican telenovela directed by Jesús Valero for Telesistema Mexicano in 1966.

Cast 
Jacqueline Andere
María Rivas
Miguel Manzano
Gloria Marin
Hortensia Santoveña
Carolina Barret
Fernando Mendoza
Luis Gimeno
Raúl "Chato" Padilla

References

External links 

Mexican telenovelas
1966 telenovelas
Televisa telenovelas
Spanish-language telenovelas
1966 Mexican television series debuts
1966 Mexican television series endings